Winterset may refer to:

 Winterset (play), a play by Maxwell Anderson
 Winterset (film), a 1936 film adaptation of the play
 Winterset, Iowa, a city in Madison County, Iowa
 Winterset City Park, a public, city-owned park in Winterset, Iowa
 Winterset Township, Russell County, Kansas
 Winterset Award, a Newfoundland and Labrador literary award

See also
 Rachel Unthank and the Winterset, a British folk music group